is Rythem's fifteenth (sixteenth overall) single and the duo's first double-A side and collaboration single (with the J-pop duo, Kimaguren). It was released on July 23, 2008 under Sony Music Entertainment Japan label. Love Call is used as an ending theme for the Nippon TV's drama Sukkiri!! making this the group's second tie-in with the said drama. Akari no Arika is also used as an ending theme for TV Tokyo's drama entitled .

The single comes in a limited (with DVD containing the PV for Love Call) and regular edition (CD only). The item's stock numbers are AICL-1953 (Limited Edition) and AICL-1954 (Regular Edition).

Limited Edition Track listing
Love Call
Composition: Yui Nītsu & ISEKI
Arrangement: TAICHI MASTER
Lyrics: Yui Nītsu
Akari no Arika
Composition/Lyrics: RYTHEM
Arrangement: Shin Kouno
Love Call (instrumental)
Akari no Arika (instrumental)

Charts and sales

2008 singles
Rythem songs
2008 songs
Sony Music Entertainment Japan singles